Fritz Rotter (1900–1984) was an Austrian writer and composer. Along with his brother Alfred he owned several Berlin theatres during the Weimar Republic but, due to his Jewish background, was forced to emigrate following the Nazi rise to power in 1933. After emigrating to the US he also used the writing alias M. Rotha ('Mausie Rotha').

Selected filmography
 The Wonderful Lies of Nina Petrovna (1929)
 When the White Lilacs Bloom Again (1929)
 Love in the Ring (1930)
 End of the Rainbow (1930)
 Lieutenant, Were You Once a Hussar? (1930)
 Spoiling the Game (1932)
 Modern Dowry (1932)
 Baby Face (1933)
 Madame Wants No Children (1933)
 Little Mother (1935)
 Nights on the Road (1952)
 Illusion in a Minor Key (1952)
 When the White Lilacs Bloom Again (1953)
 Eva (1958)

References

Bibliography 
 Marline Otte. Jewish Identities in German Popular Entertainment, 1890–1933. Cambridge University Press, 2006.

External links 
 

writers from Vienna
1900 births
1984 deaths
Austrian composers
Austrian Jews
Jewish emigrants from Nazi Germany to Switzerland